is a former Japanese football player.

Club statistics

References

External links

Matsumoto Yamaga FC

1983 births
Living people
University of Tsukuba alumni
Association football people from Saitama Prefecture
Japanese footballers
J1 League players
J2 League players
Japan Football League players
Ventforet Kofu players
Fagiano Okayama players
Matsumoto Yamaga FC players
Kamatamare Sanuki players
Association football defenders